InfoPark Thrissur is an information technology park situated in Koratty near  Chalakudy of Thrissur District in Kerala. This is the first information technology park in the state that has become operational under the 'Hub and Spoke Model', where InfoPark, Kochi acts as the hub and InfoPark Koratty as the spoke. The park is located 45 km from Kochi, 35 km from Thrissur, 5 km from Chalakudy and around 14 km from the Cochin International Airport at Nedumbassery. It is fully owned by the Government of Kerala. The InfoPark is associated with Kerala State IT Mission and Kerala State Information Technology Infrastructure Ltd.

Infrastructure
The Government of Kerala has allotted 42 acres (170,000 m2) of land for the InfoPark. Currently, InfoPark possesses 30 acres (120,000 m2) of land for the development. The plot that was given to set up the InfoPark earlier housed the Madura Coats factory. InfoPark has planned three phases of development. The Phase II of InfoPark was inaugurated on 8 January 2010, were another  was added. The construction of new multistory building has been inaugurated by Chief Minister of Kerala, Ommen Chandy on 8 September 2012.

Infopark Thrissur was also granted the Special Economic Zone (SEZ) Status by the Ministry of Commerce, Government of India in 2014 for 18 acres of land wherein the new Multi-storied IT Block ‘INDEEVARAM’ is located. In the Phase III and final phase, Government is planning to develop the 25 acres of InfoPark as a Special Economic Zone (SEZ) were 2-lakh-sqft building will be constructed. The new upcoming campus consisting of a multistory building, with more than two lakh square feet built up area got Special economic zone (SEZ) status from government of Indiain July 2014. The nearest major city next to Koratty Infopark is Chalakudy.

Employment & Companies
29 companies are working in Infopark Thrissur campus in its First phase as on 17 March 2016.and around 700 people are employed. The Initial phase of the campus opened up opportunities for Start-ups and Small Medium Businesses. SMB companies like Nuvento, QBurst, Feathersoft Info Pvt Ltd, EXAR Software Research, and startups like IGOOZ, Abbys, SandsLab, Storybox, GreenEd Multimedia, Sahrdaya Infoteck, SandsLab, Squad Technologies, Braddock Infotech, Strands Energy, FineLab Web Services a Division of WBpro LLC, Cent Technologies, Bharthi Yashloyd etc., are the present companies functioning at InfoPark.

Indeevaram
The First Multi-storeyed IT building of the campus is named as ‘INDEEVARAM’, means Blue Lotus. The Building is located in 6 acres at the Special Economic Zone area of the campus. Total Built-up area is 3.3 lakhs sq.ft with floors from Basement to 6th apart from the terrace floor reserved for Food Courts and other amenities. The Building was inaugurated by the Hon’ble Chief Minister of Kerala, Shri. Oommen Chandy on 21 January 2016.

References

Economy of Thrissur
2009 establishments in Kerala
Software technology parks in Kerala